Chedorlaomer, also spelled Kedorlaomer (Hebrew: כְּדָרְלָעֹמֶר, Tiberian: Kəḏorlā'ōmer; Vat. Χοδολλογομορ), is a king of Elam mentioned in Genesis 14. Genesis portrays him as allied with three other kings, campaigning against five Canaanite city-states in response to an uprising in the days of Abraham.

Etymology

The name Chedorlaomer is associated with familiar Elamite components, such as kudur, meaning "servant", and Lagamar, who was a high goddess in the Elamite pantheon. The 1906 Jewish Encyclopedia stated that, apart from the fact that Chedorlaomer can be identified as a proper Elamite compound, all else is matter of controversy and "the records give only the rather negative result that from Babylonian and Elamite documents nothing definite has been learned of Chedorlaomer".

Background

Chedorlaomer's reign 
After twelve years of being under Elamite rule, in the thirteenth year, the Cities of the Plain (Sodom, Gomorrah, Admah, Zeboiim, and Zoar) rebelled against Chedorlaomer. To put down the rebellion, he called upon three other allies from Shinar, Ellasar, and Tidal "nations" regions. (Genesis 14:9)

Chedorlaomer's campaigns 
The following allies fought as allies of Chedorlaomer in the fourteenth year of his rule.
King Amraphel of Shinar (possibly Sumer)
King Arioch of Ellasar
King Tidal of "nations" – possibly the Hittites

The purpose of Chedorlaomer's campaigns was to show Elam's might to all territories under Elamite authority. His armies and allies plundered tribes and cities, for their provisions, who were en route to the revolting cities of the Jordan plain.

 The Rephaim in Ashteroth Karnaim
 The Zuzim in Ham
 The Emim in Shaveh Kiriathaim
 The Horites in Mount Seir as far as El-paran near the wilderness
 The Amalekites in Kadesh at En-mishpat
 The Amorites in Hazezontamar
 The Canaanites of the cities of the Jordan plain

Chedorlaomer's defeat 

After warring against the cities of the plain at the Battle of Siddim, Chedorlaomer went to Sodom and Gomorrah to collect bounty. At Sodom, among the spoils of war, he took Lot and his entire household captive. When Lot's uncle, Abram, received news of what happened, he assembled a battle unit of 318 men who pursued the Elamite forces north of Damascus to Hobah. Abram and one of his divisions then proceeded to defeat Chedorlaomer. 

While the King James Version verse 17 translated the Hebrew word in question as "וַיַּכֵּם"  as slaughtered, Young's Literal Translation uses the term smiting.

Identifying the Kings

Genesis 14:1 gives a list of four names: "It was in the time of Amraphel king of Shinar, Arioch king of Ellasar, Chedor-Laomer king of Elam, and Tidal king of the Goiim..." Traditionally these have been taken as four separate kings:.

Amraphel has been thought by some scholars such as the writers of the Catholic Encyclopedia (1907) and The Jewish Encyclopedia (1906) to be an alternate name of the famed Hammurabi. The name is also associated with Ibal-pi-el II of Esnunna. However, this view has been largely abandoned in recent years as there were other kings named Hammurabi in Yamhad and Ugarit.Other scholars have identified Amraphel with Aralius, one of the names on the later Babylonian king-lists, attributed first to Ctesias. Recently, David Rohl argued for an identification with Amar-Sin, the third ruler of the Ur III dynasty.John Van Seters, in Abraham in History and Tradition, rejected the historical existence of Amraphel.

Arioch has been thought to have been a king of Larsa (Ellasar being an alternate version of this). It has also been suggested that it is URU KI, meaning "this place here". Others identify Ellasar with Ilan-Sura which is a city known from second millennium BC Mari archives in the vicinity of north of Mari, and Arioch with Arriwuk who appears in Mari archives as a subordinate of Zimri-Lim.

Following the discovery of documents written in the Elamite language and Babylonian language, it was thought that Chedorlaomer is a transliteration of the Elamite compound Kudur-Lagamar, meaning servant of Lagamaru – a reference to Lagamaru, an Elamite deity whose existence was mentioned by Ashurbanipal. However, no mention of an individual named Kudur Lagamar has yet been found; inscriptions that were thought to contain this name are now known to have different names (the confusion arose due to similar lettering).

Tidal has been considered to be a transliteration of Tudhaliya – either referring to the first king of the Hittite New Kingdom (Tudhaliya I) or the proto-Hittite king named Tudhaliya. With the former, the title king of Nations would refer to the allies of the Hittite kingdom such as the Ammurru and Mittani; with the latter the term "goyiim" has the sense of "them, those people". al ("their power") gives the sense of a people or tribe rather than a kingdom. Hence td goyim ("those people have created a state and stretched their power"). Others identify Goyim with Gutium, which appears in both Sumerian and Akkadian texts from 3rd millennium BC.

References 

Book of Genesis people
Elamite kings
Lech-Lecha
Torah monarchs